This is list of cases heard before the Judicial Committee of the House of Lords in 2009.
 
From October 2009, the judicial functions of the House were taken over by the Supreme Court of the United Kingdom.

See also
 2009 Judgments of the Supreme Court of the United Kingdom
 List of United Kingdom House of Lords cases
 List of notable United Kingdom House of Lords cases
 List of House of Lords cases 2008

References
 

 2009
2009 in case law
2009 in British law
United Kingdom law-related lists
Cases 2009